Switzerland was represented by Arlette Zola with the song "Amour on t'aime" at the 1982 Eurovision Song Contest which took place on 24 April. Zola was the winner of the Swiss national final for the 1982 Contest, held on 28 January.

Before Eurovision

Concours Eurovision 1982 
Swiss French broadcaster TSR was in charge of broadcasting the selection for the Swiss entry for the 1982 Contest. The national final was held in the studios of TSR in Geneva, hosted by Serge Moisson. Nine songs were submitted for the 1982 national final and the winning song was chosen by 3 regional juries representing each linguistic region of Switzerland (DRS, TSR, TSI), plus a press jury and a jury of music professionals.

At Eurovision 
On the night of the Contest, Zola performed seventh, following Finland and preceding Cyprus. At the close of voting "Amour on t'aime" received 97 points, placing Switzerland in 3rd place out of 18. At the time this was Switzerland's highest position in the contest since the 1963 Contest when Esther Ofarim finished second. The Swiss jury awarded its 12 points to the contest winner, Germany.

The Swiss conductor at the contest was Joan Amils.

Voting

References

External links 
 Swiss National Final 1982

1982
Countries in the Eurovision Song Contest 1982
Eurovision